Aaadonta kinlochi is a species of snail, a terrestrial pulmonate gastropod mollusk in the family Endodontidae. It is endemic to Palau, where it was known from Angaur and Ulong Island. If it is still extant, it is threatened by the destruction and modification of its tropical moist lowland forest habitat.

References

Endodontoid land snails from Pacific Islands (Mollusca : Pulmonata : Sigmurethra). Alan Solem ... ; [collab.] Barbara K. Solem. Chicago, Ill. :Field Museum of Natural History,1976.
Endodontoid land snails from Pacific Islands (Mollusca : Pulmonata : Sigmurethra). Alan Solem. Chicago :Field museum of Natural History,1982.

Gastropods described in 1976
Endemic fauna of Palau
Endodontidae